Kingsley is a home rule-class city in Jefferson County, Kentucky, United States. The population was 381 as of the 2010 census, down from 428 at the 2000 census. It is a suburb of Louisville.

History

Many years ago the community was part of Farmington, the once sprawling farm of the Speed family. On December 21, 1939, Kingsley was incorporated as a 6th-class city.

Geography
It is bordered to the northwest by Seneca Gardens, to the west by Strathmoor Manor, and to the northeast by Bowman Field Regional Airport.

Demographics

As of the census of 2000, there were 428 people, 180 households, and 126 families residing in the city. The racial makeup of the city was 96.50% White, 0.93% African American, 2.10% Asian, 0.23% Pacific Islander, 0.23% from other races. Hispanic or Latino of any race were 0.47% of the population.

There were 180 households, out of which 27.2% had children under the age of 18 living with them, 57.8% were married couples living together, 7.2% had a female householder with no husband present, and 30.0% were non-families. 25.0% of all households were made up of individuals, and 7.2% had someone living alone who was 65 years of age or older. The average household size was 2.38 and the average family size was 2.88.

In the city, the population was spread out, with 21.7% under the age of 18, 4.4% from 18 to 24, 31.5% from 25 to 44, 27.3% from 45 to 64, and 15.0% who were 65 years of age or older. The median age was 41 years. For every 100 females, there were 88.5 males. For every 100 females age 18 and over, there were 89.3 males.

The median income for a household in the city was $56,111, and the median income for a family was $63,750. Males had a median income of $43,542 versus $36,875 for females. The per capita income for the city was $25,348. About 1.8% of families and 3.4% of the population were below the poverty line, including 2.5% of those under age 18 and 10.4% of those age 65 or over.

Governance
Kingsley contracts an independent police force in cooperation with two other small cities, Strathmoor Village and Strathmoor Manor. The three cities have occasionally discussed merging in order to increase their political clout within Louisville Metro.

The Tree Board was established after it was noted that many of the older trees were dying or in poor health. In 2003, the National Arbor Day Foundation approved the application for the city to receive formal status as a Tree City USA. Many new trees have been planted in residents' front yards and Kingsley Green Park because of grants.

References

External links
 City of Kingsley official website

Cities in Kentucky
Cities in Jefferson County, Kentucky
Louisville metropolitan area
Populated places established in 1924
1924 establishments in Kentucky